Karbhari Laybhari is an Indian Marathi television series. It premiered from 2 November 2020 and aired on Zee Marathi. It is produced by Tejpal Wagh under the banner of Waghoba Productions. It stars Nikhil Chavan and Anushka Sarkate in lead roles.

Summary 
A politician with staunch beliefs must face several obstacle that obstruct his path while trying to maintain his Political and Love life.

Cast

Main 
 Nikhil Chavan as Rajveer Jaywant Suryavanshi (Veeru) (2020-2021)
 Anushka Sarkate as Priyanka Ankushrao Patil / Priyanka Rajveer Suryavanshi (Piyu) (2020-2021)
 Rashmi Patil as Sonali Patkure (Shona) (2020-2021)

Recurring 
Veeru's family
 Pooja Pawar-Salunkhe as Kanchan Yashwant Suryavanshi (2020-2021)
 Shrikant (KT) as Yashwant Suryavanshi (2020-2021)
 Radhika Pisal as Sunanda Vasantrao Deshmukh / Sunanda Jaywant Suryavanshi (2020-2021)
 Shrutkirti Sawant as Nisha Pruthvi Suryavanshi (2020-2021)
 Shriram Lokhande as Pruthvi Yashwant Suryavanshi (2020-2021)
 Dhananjay Jamdar as Lavhale Mama (2020-2021)
 Trupti Shedge as Dipali (Deepa) (2020-2021)

Piyu's family
 Ajay Tapkire as Ankushrao Patil (2020-2021)
 Mahesh Jadhav as Jagdish Ankushrao Patil (2020-2021)
 Somnath Vaishnav as Somnath Mane (2020-2021)

Others
 Krishna Jannu as Nagya (2020-2021)
 Supriya Pawar as Vaishali (2020-2021)
 Pranit Hate as Ganga (2020-2021)
 Anil Jadhav as Aamdar Saheb (2020-2021)
 Mayur More as Sanjay; Nisha's brother (2020)
 Shekhar Sawant as Reporter Bankar (2020-2021)
 Ashok Gurav as Pilaji (2020-2021)
 Deepak Sathe as Mr. Sathe (2020-2021)
 Shivanjali Porje as Mau (2021)
 Vinayak Jadhav as Veeru's friend (2020-2021)
 Mahesh Ambekar as Villager (2020-2021)

Production

Casting 
Nikhil Chavan was selected to play the role of Rajveer Suryavanshi who previously played a supporting role in Lagira Zhala Ji and Anushka Sarkate was selected to play the role of Priyanka Patil who was previously cast in the Shree Laxmi Narayan as Laxmi. Pranit Hate got the role of Ganga and Rashmi Patil was selected to play the role of Sonali Patkure.

Special episode (1 hour) 
 13 December 2020
 7 February 2021

Airing history

References

External links 
Karbhari Laybhari at ZEE5
 

Marathi-language television shows
2020 Indian television series debuts
Zee Marathi original programming
2021 Indian television series endings